Elias Marini, O.F.M.  or Elias Marinich (died 1641) was a Roman Catholic prelate who served as Bishop of Sardica (1624–1641).

Biography
Elias Marini was ordained a priest in the Order of Friars Minor.
On 29 July 1624, Elias Marini was appointed during the papacy of Pope Urban VIII as Bishop of Sardica.
On 18 August 1624, he was consecrated bishop by Giovanni Garzia Mellini, Cardinal-Priest of Santi Quattro Coronati, with Germanicus Mantica, Titular Bishop of Famagusta, and Antonio Bonfiglioli, Bishop Emeritus of Carinola, serving as co-consecrators. 
He served as Bishop of Sardica until his death on 15 June 1641.

References 

17th-century Roman Catholic bishops in the Ottoman Empire
Bishops appointed by Pope Urban VIII
1641 deaths
17th-century Bulgarian people
Bulgarian Roman Catholic bishops